Jerry Girard (August 6, 1932 – March 25, 2007) was an American radio personality and sports anchor, most notably at WPIX in New York City.

Early life and career
Born as Gerard Alfred Suglia in Chicago and raised in The Bronx, New York, where he attended Manhattan College, Jerry Girard went on to work as a radio disc jockey in places like Myrtle Beach, South Carolina, Altoona, Pennsylvania and Gary, Indiana, before returning to New York to work as a record librarian at WNEW (AM).

He first joined WPIX in 1967 as a news writer, and in 1974 replaced Don Ellison as sports anchor. He had a dry sense of humor and a style that treated his viewers like they were intelligent sports fans.  He often gave horse racing results at the end of his segments. He also distinguished himself among sportscasters by eschewing the usual practice of showing highlights of sports games, instead opting to show key plays that would lend themselves to his particular takes on the games in question.

His run with WPIX ended in 1995 when he resigned rather than accept a demotion after 21 years as the sports anchor. He was replaced by Sal Marchiano.

Death
Girard died in Hawthorne, New York, aged 74, after a year-long battle with esophageal cancer.

References
 New York Post, September 24, 2006 : "Play cries out 'Jerry Girard!'" by Phil Mushnick.
 New York Daily News,  March 26, 2007 : "Longtime Sportscaster Jerry Girard Dead at 75" by Bill Hutchinson.
 New York Post, March 26, 2007 : "Girard dies at 74" by Phil Mushnick.

External links
  Obituary at the New York Daily News
  Obituary at the New York Post
  Obituary at The Journal News
  Obituary at The New York Times

1932 births
2007 deaths
American people of Italian descent
Manhattan College alumni
Radio personalities from Chicago
People from the Bronx
Deaths from esophageal cancer
Television anchors from New York City
Deaths from cancer in New York (state)
People from Hawthorne, New York